Snackmasters is an Australian cooking competition television show based on the BAFTA-nominated British series of the same name. Broadcast by the Nine Network, it is hosted by Scott Pickett and Poh Ling Yeow, with Yvie Jones as a co-presenter.

In September 2021, it was announced that Nine had commissioned a local version of the series set to air in the fourth quarter of 2021. The series was originally intended to premiere on 22 November 2021, however the series ultimately premiered on 29 November 2021. A second season started airing from 4 December 2022.

Format 

Each episode sees two professional chefs compete to recreate a brand-name snack or fast food item. The chefs present their replica snack to a panel of judges composed of workers involved with the manufacture of the snack, and the chef who is decided to have most faithfully recreated the snack wins the competition. During each episode, Jones visits the factory that manufactures each snack, comparing how accurately the chefs are recreating the item.

The first season of the show featured stand alone episodes following the original British format, while the second season shifted to a new knockout competition format.

Episodes

Season 1

Season 2

Notes

References

External links  
 Snackmasters at 9Now

2020s Australian reality television series
2021 Australian television series debuts
Australian cooking television series
Nine Network original programming
Television series by Warner Bros. Television Studios
Cooking competitions in Australia
Television shows filmed in Australia
Australian television series based on British television series
Food reality television series